I Ribelli (English: The Rebels) were an Italian rock group. Originally formed in 1959 as Adriano Celentano's backup band, they later continued performing as an independent act. The band is best known for their cover versions of some of The Beatles' songs and Brian Poole & The Tremeloes' "Keep on Dancin'", entitled . Some of the band members such as keyboardist Enzo Jannacci and guitarist Gino Santercole went on to successful solo careers.

Members
 Gianni Dall'Aglio - drums
 Giorgio Benacchio - guitar
 Dino Pasquadibisceglie (1959–1964) - bass
 Gino Santercole (1959–1963) - vocal, guitar
 Enzo Jannacci (1959–1961) - keyboards
 Nando De Luca (1961–1962) - keyboards
 Ricky Gianco (1966–68) - guitar, vocals
 Giannino Zinzone (1961-1962) - bass
 Natale Massara (1961–1970) - vocal, saxophone, wind instruments
 Gianfranco Lombardi (1962–1963) -  bass
 Jean Claude Bichara (1963–1966)-  bass
 Angel Salvador (1966–1970) - bass
 Philippe Bichara (1963–1966) - vocals, percussion
 Demetrio Stratos (1966–1970) -  vocals, keyboards
 Dino D'Autorio (1977) - bass

Discography

Singles
1961 "Enrico VIII" / "200 all'ora" - (Celson, QB 8031)
1961 "Alle nove al bar" / "Danny boy"' - (Arcobal, R 6000)
1962 "La cavalcata" / "Serenata a Valle Chiara" - (Clan Celentano, ACC 24002)
1964 "Chi sarà la ragazza del Clan?" / "Quella donna" - (Clan Celentano, R 6002)
1966 "A la buena de dios" / "Ribelli" - (Clan Celentano, ACC 24034)
1966 "Per una lira" / "Ehi...voi!" - (Clan Celentano, ACC 24039)
1966 "Come Adriano" / "Enchinza bubu" - (Clan Celentano, ACC 24041)
1967 "Pugni chiusi" / "La follia" - (Dischi Ricordi, SRL 10451)
1967 "Chi mi aiuterà" / "Un giorno se ne va" - (Dischi Ricordi, SRL 10470)
1968 "Come sempre" / "Nel sole, nel vento, nel sorriso, nel pianto" - (Dischi Ricordi, SRL 10506)
1968 "Yummy Yummy Yummy" / "Un posto al sole" - (Dischi Ricordi, SRL 10514)
1969 "Obladì Obladà" / "Lei m'ama" - (Dischi Ricordi, SRL 10522)
1969 "Goodbye" / "Josephine" - (Dischi Ricordi, SRL 10549)
1970 "Oh! Darling!" / "Il vento non sa leggere" - (Dischi Ricordi, SRL 10579)
1977 "Illusione/Calore" - (Dischi Ricordi, SRL 10843)

LPs
1968 I Ribelli - (Dischi Ricordi, SMRP 9052)
1988 I Ribelli live - (CGD, LSM1315)

CDs
 2002: I Ribelli (The Rebels). (Sony/BMG 191192)
 2010: Cantano Adriano (Sing Adriano). (Indie Europe/Zoom 7794766)

References

External links
  Official site
  I Ribelli nei primi anni '60
I Ribelli on Second Hand Songs

Italian-language singers
Beat groups
Musical groups disestablished in 1970
Musical groups established in 1959
Italian rock music groups
Musical groups from Milan
1959 establishments in Italy
1970 disestablishments in Italy